St. George's Church is a church in Dardhë, Korçë County, Albania. It has been a Cultural Monument of Albania since 1970.

References

Cultural Monuments of Albania
Churches in Korçë County
Churches in Albania